Patrick Arthur Maxwell (10 July 1869 – 17 March 1902) was an Irish first-class cricketer and medical doctor.

Maxwell was born at Dublin, one of four Maxwell brothers who were educated in England at Ushaw College. It is likely he studied at Trinity College, Dublin, given his later, albeit brief, career as a medical doctor. Playing his club cricket in Dublin for Dublin University, Maxwell made his debut in first-class cricket for the university against the Marylebone Cricket Club at College Park in May 1895. In June, he toured England with the university, playing a further two first-class matches against Cambridge University at Cambridge, and Leicestershire at Leicester. He made a final first-class appearance for the university in July, when Cambridge University visited Dublin for the return fixture between the sides. Across his four first-class matches, Maxwell scored 105 runs at an average of 13.12, with a highest score of 39. He emigrated to Australia not long after, where he practiced medicine at Kalgoorlie in Western Australia. He died there, on Saint Patrick's Day, in March 1902. He is buried at Kalgoorlie Cemetery.

References

External links

1869 births
1902 deaths
Cricketers from Dublin (city)
Alumni of Ushaw College
Alumni of Trinity College Dublin
Irish cricketers
Dublin University cricketers
19th-century Irish medical doctors
20th-century Irish medical doctors
Irish expatriates in Australia
Military personnel from Dublin (city)